Qingshan District forms part of the urban core of and is one of 13 urban districts of the prefecture-level city of Wuhan, the capital of Hubei Province, China. On the right bank of the Yangtze, it borders the districts of Wuchang (for a very small section) to the southwest and Hongshan to the east and south, except for Tianxing Island which lies due north of Qingshan; on the opposite bank it borders Jiang'an.

Geography

Administrative divisions

As of 2015, Qingshan District administers ten subdistricts, one administrative committee and one economic development zone:

References

Geography of Wuhan
County-level divisions of Hubei